

B
Chuck Braidwood

C
Algy Clark,
Al Cornsweet,
Hank Critchfield,
David Cullen

D
Fred Danziger

E
Doc Elliott

G
Mike Gregory

H
Hoot Herrin,
John Hurley,
Merle Hutson

J
Leo Jensvold,
Ernie Jessen,
Al Jolley,
Red Joseph

K
Howie Kriss

L
Buck Lamme,
Biff Lee,
Franklin Lewis,
Tiny Lewis,
Babe Lyon

M
Stu MacMillan,
Dave Mishel,
George Munday

N
Al Nesser,
Ray Novotny

P
Carl Pignatelli

R
Don Ridler

T
Jim Tarr

V
Otto Vokaty

W
Dale Waters,
Chuck Weimer,
Drip Wilson,
Hoge Workman

References
Pro Football Reference Cleveland Indians (NFL 1931) Roster

 
Cleveland Indians (NFL 1931)
Indians (NFL 1931) players